Human Harvest may refer to:
 Human Harvest (album), a 2003 album by Circle of Dead Children
 Bats: Human Harvest, a 2007 Sci-Fi Channel original film
 Human Harvest (film),  a 2014 documentary film about human organs harvesting and trafficking in China